Gus is the "spokesgroundhog" in more than 80 commercials for the instant scratch-off lottery games run by the Pennsylvania Lottery from 2004–2012 and 2015–present.

The original concept for Gus was created by MARC USA, an advertising agency based in Pittsburgh, PA. The concept was brought to life as an animatronic groundhog, created in 2004 by The Character Shop, Inc., a Hollywood creature effects company.

Gus is billed as the "second most famous groundhog in Pennsylvania", as a nod to Punxsutawney Phil.  His tag line is "keep on scratchin'!"

Gus appears in television commercials at the beginning of many months during the year and throughout the winter holiday season.  The spots air in all television markets in Pennsylvania, with overlap into portions of all of Pennsylvania's neighboring states where Pennsylvania television signals are available.  As of February 2011, the Pennsylvania Lottery claimed that Gus has appeared in more than 50 commercials.  In 2008, a girlfriend named Gabby was introduced to the Pennsylvania Lottery commercials, and the two were shown visiting the Pocono Mountains every Valentine's Day, as a nod to the importance of romantic tourism to that region's economy. Other "family members" have also appeared in commercials.

Gus required five puppeteers (Rick Lazzarini, Stephen R. Blandino, Debra Smith, Bob Mano, and Kacey Scappa) to operate.  One operated his head and body, one did his arms, one for his mouth and lip-sync, and another 2 for the rest of his facial movements.  His face was incredibly expressive, with dual axis ears, eyes up/down. eyes side/side, and blinks, 2-axis eyebrows, nose up/down, 2 axis jaw, smile, and 4 axis lip movement.  Due to Gus's small size, many of the servos needed to provide his animatronic functions are mounted externally, with the cables running through spring housings on their way up to his head.

Gus, with his lovable, wise-cracking personality, gained much popularity with Pennsylvanians; however, the Pennsylvania Lottery does not offer plush replicas of Gus for sale despite customer requests because it believes that such a toy would advertise the lottery (a game which is restricted to adult play) to children.

Gus has also appeared dressed in both Philadelphia Eagles and Pittsburgh Steelers uniforms with other similarly uniformed men in a licensed co-branding with those two National Football League teams, as certain instant games are branded for those teams.

On February 22, 2012, the Pennsylvania Lottery announced that the campaign with Gus would be discontinued, so they could focus on a new campaign explaining how the PA Lottery benefits older Pennsylvanians, but after a nearly four-year hiatus, he returned on November 1, 2015 onwards.

However, Gus's heralded "return" was in an updated computer digital image (CGI) with the conversion costing $68,700 in addition to an almost $400,000 advertising campaign. The decision to convert the popular character to pure CGI was initially somewhat controversial, prompting petitions and social media pages to be created to save Gus from transforming from a real-life creation to one some believed would have no real interplay with the other on-camera actors.

See also
Punxsutawney Phil

References

2004 robots
Advertising characters
Male characters in advertising
Mascots introduced in 2004
Animatronic robots
Groundhogs